Rescue and salvage ships (hull classification symbol ARS) are a type of military salvage tug. They are tasked with coming to the aid of stricken vessels. Their general mission capabilities include combat salvage, lifting, towing, retraction of grounded vessels, off-ship firefighting, and manned diving operations. They were common during World War II.

List of rescue and salvage ships of the United States Navy by class
The following ship classes have been designated under the ARS hull classification symbol in United States Navy Service.

Lapwing-class minesweeper conversions

The earliest designated United States Navy salvage ships (ARS) were converted s. Ships of this type were operated by the United States Navy as salvage ships from June 1941 until USS Viking was decommissioned and scrapped in 1953.

Diver class

The United States Navy operated s (ARS) from October 1943 until the last example was decommissioned in July 1979. Several ships of this class were converted to other uses, and USS Shackle remained in service as the 213' United States Coast Guard Cutter  until March 2011.
 
  (Converted to USCGC Escape (WMEC-6))
 
 
  (Converted to )
 
  (Converted to USNS Chain (T-AGOR-17))
 
 
 
 
 
  (Converted to USCGC Yocona (WAT-168))
  (Converted to USNS Argo (T-AGOR-18))

Miscellaneous civilian vessel conversions
Several ships were converted and redesignated as salvage ships (ARS) during World War II.
  (canceled)

Anchor class

The United States Navy operated s (ARS) from October 1943 until March 1946.

Weight class

The United States Navy operated s (ARS) from August 1943 until the last example was decommissioned in June 1946. The Weight-class ships were originally intended for delivery to the Royal Navy under different names, as part of the Lend-Lease program. However, they were instead delivered to and operated by the United States Navy.

Bolster class

s (ARS) were operated by the United States Navy from July 1944 until the last example was decommissioned in September 1994.
  
 
 
  
 
 
  (canceled)
  (canceled)
  (canceled)
  (canceled)
  (canceled)
  (canceled)

Safeguard class

s (T-ARS) are operated by Military Sealift Command in support of United States Navy operations. They were operated by the United States Navy as commissioned auxiliaries from November 1982 until the last example (Safeguard) was decommissioned in September 2007. Two are currently in service as part of the MSC. 
  - Decommissioned 
 
  
  - Decommissioned 
 ARS-54 (unnamed, canceled)

References

 
Ship types
Auxiliary ships of the United States Navy